The United Nations University Institute for Integrated Management of Material Fluxes and of Resources (UNU-FLORES), established in 2012, is one of the 13 institutes that make up the United Nations University (UNU) — a global think tank and postgraduate teaching organisation headquartered in Tokyo, Japan.

Located in Dresden, the capital of Saxony, Germany, UNU-FLORES is an internationally recognised thought leader engaging in research on the sustainable use and integrated management of water, soil, waste, energy, and other geo-resources with a focus on developing and transitional countries. UNU-FLORES advances the Resource Nexus — an integrated approach to the sustainable management of environmental resources and addresses global environmental challenges by bridging scientific research and policy. With its office situated in the World Trade Center Dresden, the Institute works closely with the Technische Universität Dresden (TU Dresden), among other research institutes and universities.

As part of UNU, the mandate of UNU-FLORES is to support the United Nations and its member states through research, postgraduate education and capacity building. At a greater scale, UNU-FLORES is part of the UN System.

Organisation and institutional structure

Mission 
To contribute to the mandate of UNU as a research institute with an agenda guided by policy relevance; to be seen as a global think tank and postgraduate teaching organisation as well as a hub for advanced training, capacity development, and knowledge dissemination.

Strategic direction 

The core objectives of UNU-FLORES are as follows:

1. Pursue policy-relevant programming: by continuing to make policy considerations central to its research programmes and to actively shape policy agendas through targeted and strategic collaborations.

2. Invest in a dynamic, innovative, and diverse institutional culture: by encouraging innovation in all dimensions of the University's work, which is undertaken by a diverse and gender-balanced community of scholars, communicators, and management professionals, and by promoting collaboration across spatial and disciplinary boundaries.

3. Strengthen collaboration, communications, and visibility: by leveraging the expertise and networks spread across the UNU system, promoting collaboration, impactful communications undertakings, and ensuring that UNU research meets actual demands.

4. Strive for financial sustainability across UNU's architecture: by addressing the financial constraints that would otherwise undermine ambitious, long-term research planning, and ensure thorough participatory management practices with realistic, achievable, and complement other strategic priorities as fundraising objectives.

Advisory committee 
The International Advisory Committee of UNU-FLORES, comprising eminent scientists from different fields and regions of the world, is entrusted by the Council and Rector of UNU to advise on the research and other activities of UNU-FLORES. The committee officially convenes on an annual basis. The current Chair is Prof. Wim van Vierssen from the Netherlands.

The Director of UNU-FLORES has overall responsibility for the research and management of the Institute and implements the research programmes within the policies and guidelines set out by the International Advisory Committee and the Council.

Foundation and leadership 
While UNU was formally inaugurated in 1975, UNU-FLORES was founded on 20 December 2012. The founding director of UNU-FLORES was Prof. Reza Ardakanian of Iran. Prior to his directorship, Ardakanian was the Director of the UN-Water Decade Programme on Capacity Development since 2007, and was Vice-Rector of UNU in Europe, ad interim (2009–2011). He holds a PhD in Water Resources Management from McMaster University and is a faculty member of Sharif University of Technology in Tehran, Iran. In October 2017, Ardakanian was appointed as the Minister of Energy of the Islamic Republic of Iran by President Hassan Rouhani. 

On 3 September 2018, Prof. Edeltraud Günther assumed the position of Director at UNU-FLORES. Günther received her doctorate in Environmental Accounting from the University of Augsburg and had been the Chair of Environmental Management and Accounting at TU Dresden since 1996. She initiated the Centre for Performance and Policy Research in Sustainability Measurement and Assessment (PRISMA) in 2016.

Key research areas 
UNU-FLORES aims to advance the Resource Nexus for all environmental resources: water, soil, waste, energy, and other geo-resources that are of concern to the United Nations and its member states – particularly in developing and emerging economies.

UNU-FLORES research covers topics related to the nexus of the following environmental resources, complemented by data analysis and integrative modelling tools:

 water (e.g., water scarcity, integrated watershed management)
 soil (e.g., counteracting soil degradation, securing soil functions, fostering sustainable land-use management)
 waste (e.g., preventing losses and closing cycles of resources; avoiding contamination of water and soil)
 energy (in relation to water, soil, and waste; non-renewables and renewables)
 geo-resources (e.g., groundwater, rehabilitating sites)

All key research areas are closely connected to the overarching priorities of the UN and UNU.

Programmes, projects, and activities 
The diverse activities of UNU-FLORES in the fields of science, education, capacity development, and communications and advocacy have resulted in a wide variety of knowledge products for different target groups.

Joint PhD Programme in Integrated Management of Water, Soil, and Waste 

Launched in 2015, UNU-FLORES offers a joint PhD programme in collaboration with the Faculty of Environmental Sciences at TU Dresden. The programme provides graduate students with a critical understanding and tools to take an interdisciplinary and integrated approach towards water, soil, and waste management. To date, eight doctoral candidates have graduated from the programme.

Nexus Seminars 
One of the notable events arising from the collaboration between UNU-FLORES and PRISMA – Centre for Sustainability Assessment and Policy on behalf of TU Dresden, is the Nexus Seminar Series. The joint seminar series, which launched in 2015, features lectures by senior scholars that highlight all dimensions of research on the Nexus Approach, ranging from hands-on implementation strategies to theoretical debates. The Nexus Seminars serve not only as a platform for scientific exchange and cooperation between UNU-FLORES and TU Dresden but also a medium for the partner institutions to discuss their research with a broader audience.

Dresden Nexus Conference (DNC) 
Jointly organised with TU Dresden and the Leibniz Institute of Ecological Urban and Regional Development (IOER), the first biennial conference was held from 25–27 March 2015. Each day was centred around the Nexus Approach vis-à-vis one aspect of global change: climate, urbanisation and population growth, to achieve the potential targets of the post-2015 Sustainable Development Goals. In 2017, the conference addressed the theme "SDGs and the Nexus Approach – Monitoring and Implementation". With a focus on resilient cities, the conference mainly targeted multifunctional land-use systems and resource management in resilient cities.

DNC2020, with the theme "Circular Economy in a Sustainable Society”, was held in a virtual format in response to the COVID-19 pandemic. This event received an impressive turnout, with 1216 registered participants from 101 countries, featuring 13 sessions, six expert statements, and five keynotes speeches.

Partnerships 
UNU-FLORES has an extensive network of partners across UN member states, universities and research institutions, the United Nations University (UNU) network, UN entities, international organisations and networks, and the private sector.

The cornerstone of UNU-FLORES's formalised agreements is the funding agreement with the Institute’s core donors: the Federal Ministry of Education and Research of the Federal Republic of Germany (BMBF) and the Saxon State Ministry for Higher Education, Research and the Arts (SMWK). TU Dresden is an important strategic partner.

UNU-FLORES was also integral in establishing the UNU Water Network, with Prof. Edeltraud Günther acting as founding Chair of the Network.

References

External links
 United Nations University Institute for Integrated Management of Material Fluxes and of Resources (UNU-FLORES)
 United Nations University (UNU)

International universities
United Nations University
Research institutes in the United Nations System